Paddys River, a watercourse of the Murray catchment within the Murray–Darling basin, is located in the Australian Alpine region of New South Wales, Australia.

Course and features
The river rises below Granite Mountain, east of Tumbarumba, on the western slopes of the Snowy Mountains within Bago State Forest, and its natural flow drains generally south, and then south-west, before reaching its confluence with the Tumbarumba Creek, north of the village of Tooma; descending  over its  course. The river is impounded by Paddys River Dam.

See also

 List of rivers of New South Wales (L–Z)
 Snowy Mountains
 Rivers of New South Wales

References

External links
 
Paddys River Facebook Page

Rivers of New South Wales
Murray-Darling basin
Rivers in the Riverina